Carlos Wilson (14 August 1912 – 26 February 1996) was an Argentine footballer, who played in Talleres de Remedios de Escalada and Boca Juniors.

Career 
Wilson was born in Remedios de Escalada, (province of Buenos Aires) he started in the lower divisions of Talleres. Wilson debuted at 17 years playing in the first division club Talleres de Remedios de Escalada. His excellent performances earned him a place in the National team, that competed in the Sudamericano de Lima 1935. He played as a starter 3 matches this tournament.

In 1936 and 1937 Wilson played for Boca Juniors, who were chasing the Campeonato de Primera División 1936. He then played for Club Atlético Lanús, and in 1940 returned to Talleres where he ended his career.

He was also Grand Master of the Grand Lodge of Argentina of Free and Accepted Masons for three periods and made honorary member of Excelsior Lodge number 617 under the United Grand Lodge of England.

He died in Buenos Aires on February 26, 1996, and his remains were buried at the Santa Catalina British Cemetery in Llavallol.

References

External links 
www.bdfa.com.ar
www.worldfootball.net

Argentine footballers
Argentina international footballers
Footballers from Buenos Aires
Boca Juniors footballers
Argentine people of English descent
1912 births
1996 deaths
Talleres de Remedios de Escalada footballers
Association football defenders
Río de la Plata